Giarsun is a village in Graubünden, Switzerland.

Villages in Graubünden